The Cow's Kimona is a 1926 American film starring Glenn Tryon and featuring Oliver Hardy. Hardy's scenes would later be deleted.

Plot

Cast
 Glenn Tryon
 Charles Sellon as The father
 Oliver Hardy (scenes deleted)

See also
 Oliver Hardy filmography

External links

1926 films
American silent short films
American black-and-white films
Films directed by Fred Guiol
Films directed by James Parrott
1926 short films
Silent American comedy films
American comedy short films
1926 comedy films
1920s American films
Films about cattle
1920s English-language films